The 1946 Davis Cup was the 35th edition of the most important tournament between national teams in men's tennis. The trophy and tournament were renamed for the founder, Dwight F. Davis, upon his death in 1945. This was the first edition since the end of World War II. 15 teams entered the Europe Zone, and 5 teams entered the America Zone.

The United States defeated Mexico in the America Zone final, and Sweden defeated Yugoslavia in the Europe Zone final. The USA defeated Sweden in the Inter-Zonal play-off, and then defeated defending champions Australia in the Challenge Round. The final was played at Kooyong Stadium in Melbourne, Australia on 26–30 December.

America Zone

Draw

Final
United States vs. Mexico

Europe Zone

Draw

Final
Sweden vs. Yugoslavia

Inter-Zonal Final
United States vs. Sweden

Challenge Round
Australia vs. United States

References

External links
Davis Cup official website

 
Davis Cups by year
Davis Cup
Davis Cup
Davis Cup
Davis Cup